Jim Henson Records is an American record company established in 1992 by The Jim Henson Company in an agreement with Bertelsmann Music Group. Robert Kraft was selected to run the label. The first album released by Jim Henson Records was the soundtrack to the film The Muppet Christmas Carol in 1992.

See also
 List of record labels

References

External links

Record labels established in 1992
Record labels disestablished in 1994
Defunct record labels of the United States
Records